15 Lacertae is a binary star system in the northern constellation of Lacerta, near the southeast constellation border with Andromeda. It is faintly visible to the naked eye with an apparent visual magnitude of 4.95. The distance to this system is approximately 337 light years based on parallax. It is drifting closer to the Sun with a radial velocity of −19 km/s. The absolute magnitude of 15 Lacertae is −0.04.

The primary component is an aging red giant with a stellar classification of M0 III. With the supply of hydrogen at its core exhausted, the star has cooled and expanded to 37 times the Sun's radius. It is radiating 295 times the luminosity of the Sun from its swollen photosphere at an effective temperature of 3,915 K, giving it a reddish hue.

The secondary companion was discovered by American astronomer S. W. Burnham in 1888.

References

M-type giants
Binary stars
Lacerta (constellation)
Durchmusterung objects
Lacertae, 15
216397
112917
8699